Howland Capital Management LLC is a Boston, Massachusetts-based private investment advisory firm. The company was founded in 1967 by Weston Howland Jr. to serve the interests of one family. The successful supervision of their wealth set the standard and provided stability for the firm as it evolved from a family office into a multifaceted private investment advisor. The firm has grown to serve a wide range of clients including individuals, families and small institutions - providing the prudent and personal counsel that a constantly changing investment environment requires.

Howland Capital is a privately owned, SEC Registered Investment Advisor with over $2.6 billion in assets under management. The firm has made the strategic decision to remain independent in order to provide the personal attention, client-centric focus, and continuity that clients deserve.  Its staff includes former Olympic silver medalist Charles Clapp.

References

Howland Capital Management at Highbeam

External links
Official site

Investment management companies of the United States